Calvin Klein Inc. is an internationally operating, American fashion house. The company, which became famous for its designer underwear and denim lines in the 1980s, specializes in mass-market ready-to-wear clothing for all genders and age groups as well as leather products, lifestyle accessories and shoes, home furnishings, perfume/cosmetics, eyewear, jewellery and watches in the mid-price segment. Its high-end runway fashion division, which represented the top level of the various Calvin Klein sub-brands, was discontinued in 2019.

The company was founded by designer Calvin Klein and his childhood friend, Barry K. Schwartz, in 1968 and was acquired by PVH Corp. for a total of $700 million in 2003. It is headquartered in Midtown Manhattan, New York City, and has substantial market share in retail and commercial lines around the globe. In 2013, PVH bought Warnaco Group, one of the largest Calvin Klein licensees, for around $3 billion. Global retail sales under the Calvin Klein brand, including sales by the label's 40 licensees, amounted to $8.5 billion in 2021.

History

The early years 
Calvin Klein was one of several design leaders raised in the Jewish community in the Bronx, along with Robert Denning and Ralph Lauren. He became a protégé of Baron de Gunzburg, through whose introductions he became the toast of the New York elite fashion scene even before he had his first mainstream success with the launch of his first jeans line. He was immediately recognized for his talent after his first major showing at New York Fashion Week.

In 1968, Klein founded Calvin Klein Limited, a coat shop in the York Hotel in New York City, with $10,000. The first Calvin Klein collection was a line of "youthful, understated coats and dresses" featured at the New York City store Bonwit Teller.

In September 1969, Klein appeared on the cover of Vogue magazine.

1970s 
By 1971, Klein had added sportswear, classic blazers, and lingerie to his women's collection.

In 1973, he received his first Coty American Fashion Critics' Award for his 74-piece womenswear collection – the youngest recipient at that time. Klein won the award again in 1974 and 1975. By 1977, annual revenues had increased to $30 million (equivalent to $ million in ), and Klein had licenses for scarves, shoes, belts, furs, sunglasses, and bedsheets. Klein and Schwartz were making $4 million each. After the company signed licenses for cosmetics, jeans, and menswear,  Klein's annual retail volume was estimated at $100 million (equivalent to $ million in ). In 1978, Klein claimed sales of 200,000 pairs of his famous jeans the first week they were on the market. By 1981, Fortune figured Klein's annual income at $8.5 million. In the mid-1970s, he had created a designer-jeans craze by putting his name on the back pocket. Klein's design assistant at the time, Jeffrey Banks, has claimed credit for the logo garments, stating that he had the logo from a press folder silkscreened onto the sleeve of a brown T-shirt as a present for Klein. The gift was assumed by Schwartz to be part of the upcoming line, and similar logo shirts formed the uniform for the front-of-house staff at Klein's next catwalk show, leading to buyer demand.

In the late 1970s, the company also made attempts to set up its own fragrance and cosmetics lines, but soon withdrew from the market with big financial losses.

1980s 
In the 1980s, as the designer-jeans frenzy reached its all-time high, Calvin Klein introduced a highly successful line of boxer shorts for women and a men's underwear collection which would later gross $70 million in a single year. The American market of men's underwear was changed – from one where most men's underwear was white, purchased in packs of three by a "wife, mother or girlfriend when they needed to be" to one where "the American male [cares] about the brand of something few ever see".

Growth continued through the early eighties. The licensing program, which brought in $24,000 when it was initiated in 1974, had royalty income of $7.3 million ten years later (equivalent to $ million in ). That year, worldwide retail sales were estimated at more than $60 million (equivalent to $ million in ). Klein's clothes were sold through 12,000 stores in the United States and were available in six other countries through licensing deals, namely Canada, the United Kingdom, Ireland, Australia, New Zealand, and Japan. His annual income passed $12 million (equivalent to $ million in ).

Financial problems increased pressure from all sides, disagreements with the licensee of the menswear line and its disappointing sales as well as an enormous employee turnover both within Calvin Klein and its licensing partners led to the first rumors that Calvin Klein Industries, as the company had been known by then, was up for sale. And indeed, in late 1987, it was said that the sale of the company to Triangle Industries, a container manufacturer, had only failed because of the crashing stock market.

1990s 
Although the company almost faced bankruptcy in 1992, Calvin Klein managed to regain and increase the profitability of his empire throughout the later 1990s, mainly through the success of its highly popular underwear and fragrance lines, as well as the ck sportswear line. During his 1990–1995 stint as Calvin Klein's head of menswear design, John Varvatos pioneered a type of men's underwear called boxer briefs, a hybrid of boxer shorts and briefs. Made famous by a series of 1992 print ads featuring Mark "Marky Mark" Wahlberg, they have been called "one of the greatest apparel revolutions of the century."

Klein was named "America's Best Designer" for his minimalist all-American designs in 1993, and it came as a surprise in 1999 when it was announced that CKI was again up for sale. Planning to expand its business, the company had been approached by two luxury goods companies, LVMH and Pinault Printemps Redoute, to join Calvin Klein, but nothing resulted. Other potentials like Tommy Hilfiger Corp. and Italy's Holding di Partecipazioni proved to be similar disappointments because of CKI's steep price tag of supposedly $1 billion. After seven months and no potential buyer, Klein announced that his empire was not on the market anymore. The company would never manage to go public, which had supposedly been Klein's plan once.

2002–present: Acquisition by Phillips van Heusen 
In mid-December 2002, Calvin Klein Inc. (CKI) was sold to Phillips Van Heusen Corp (PVH), whose then CEO Bruce Klatsky was the driving force behind the deal, for about $400 million in cash, $30 million in stock as well as licensing rights and royalties linked to revenues over the following 15 years that were estimated at $200 to $300 million. The sale also included an ongoing personal financial incentive for Klein based on future sales of the Calvin Klein brand.

PVH outbid VF Corp., the maker of Lee and Wrangler jeans, which had also been interested in the jeans, underwear and swimwear business of CK that had been controlled by Warnaco Group, maker of Speedo swimwear in the US, since 1997. The deal with PVH did not include these businesses, and they remained with Warnaco. Unable to pay debts from acquisitions and licensing agreements and due to bad publicity by a later dismissed lawsuit with Calvin Klein over selling license products to retailers other than agreed upon with Calvin Klein, Warnaco had filed for chapter 11 protection in mid-2001 but eventually emerged from bankruptcy in February 2003.

The transaction between Calvin Klein and PVH was financially supported by Apax Partners Inc., a New York private equity firm, which is said to have made a $250 million equity investment in PVH convertible preferred stock, as well as a $125 million, two-year secured note, all in exchange for seats on the board of PVH.

CKI thus became a wholly owned subsidiary of PVH. In the beginning, Klein himself, who was included as a person in the 15-year contract he had signed with PVH, remained creative head of the collections but then continued as an advisor (consulting creative director) to the new company from 2003 on and has since been more withdrawn from the business. Barry K. Schwartz was said to concentrate on his role as chairman of the New York Racing Association, a horse-racing club. The current President and COO of the CKI division within PVH are Tom Murry, who had filled this position already before the acquisition.

Upon the acquisition of Calvin Klein, Phillips-Van Heusen announced plans of launching a new men's sportswear collection that rivals Ralph Lauren's collection. This line is produced by Van Heusen.

With the fall 2006 Collection runway presentations in New York City, CKI inaugurated an  showroom space that can seat up to 600 people on the ground floor of 205 West 39th Street, in Times Square South where Calvin Klein has been headquartered since 1978.

In a 2010 report, PVH, who manages the ready-to-wear activities, had estimated sales of €4.6 billion of Calvin Klein products.

In February 2013, Warnaco Group was acquired by PVH which united Calvin Klein formal, underwear, jeans and sportswear lines.

In 2020, PVH announced that as part of their animal welfare policy, the company does not use exotic skins and would be banning their use in Calvin Klein collections when "our annual update of that policy is released."

Product and brand history 

The most visible brand names in the Calvin Klein portfolio include:
 Calvin Klein 205W39NYC (black label, upscale top-end designer line)
 ck Calvin Klein (grey label, recently repositioned as bridge collection line; licensed to Warnaco Group, Inc. through at least 2044. PVH acquired Warnaco Group in Feb 2013)
 Calvin Klein (white label, basic fashion better sportswear line)
 Calvin Klein Sport (sports version of the white label line for Macy's)
 Calvin Klein Jeans (denimwear line; licensed to Warnaco Group through at least 2044. PVH acquired Warnaco Group in Feb 2013)
 Calvin Klein Home (high end bedding, towel, bath rug and accessory collections)
 The Khaki Collection (youthful medium to high end bedding, towel, bath rug and accessories) discontinued in 2008
 Calvin Klein Golf (launched in late 2007)
 Calvin Klein Underwear (underwear collections; licensed to Warnaco Group through at least 2044. PVH acquired Warnaco Group in Feb 2013)
 CK one Lifestyle brand (fragrance, underwear, jeans -launched 2011)
 Calvin Klein Watches + Jewelry (watches launched in 1997, jewelry in 2004)

For details, see Current brands and licenses.

Fragrances 
Calvin Klein has various lines of perfumes and colognes, including Obsession, CK Be, and Eternity.  Until May 2005, their perfumes and the corresponding fragrance lines were maintained by Calvin Klein Cosmetics Company (CKCC), a Unilever company. Cosmetics giant Coty, Inc. of New York bought the fragrance licensing agreements from Unilever.

Advertising 
The early ads were shot by Bruce Weber and Richard Avedon. One of his male underwear models, Mark Wahlberg, went on to fame as hip hop star "Marky Mark", launching himself into the Hollywood scene to become a current actor. Another Hollywood star first appearing in Calvin Klein advertisements is Antonio Sabàto Jr. Calvin Klein employed Kate Moss at the start of her career in the early 1990s and in 2002 after allegations of cocaine use. Other models who have appeared in advertisements early in their careers are Natalia Vodianova, and Toni Garrn. Currently Calvin Klein uses Shawn Mendes, Tyson Ballou, Jennie and Lara Stone, and in the past has also used Christy Turlington, Jerry Hall, Patti Hansen, Tom Hintnaus, Travis Fimmel, Doutzen Kroes, Mini Andén, Garrett Neff, Sean O'Pry, Edita Vilkevičiūtė, Jamie Dornan, Liu Wen and Edward Furlong. 

Actors such as Eva Mendes, Mehcad Brooks, Scarlett Johansson, Kellan Lutz, Andie MacDowell, Alexander Skarsgård, Zoe Saldana, Rita Ora, Rooney Mara, Lupita Nyong'o, Margot Robbie, Saoirse Ronan, Jake Gyllenhaal and Diane Kruger have also been chosen to model for the brand. Swedish footballer Freddie Ljungberg starred in a series of adverts for the company. Recently, pop star Justin Bieber appeared in advertising for Calvin Klein's underwear range, as did fashion model Kendall Jenner. In 2017, Solange Knowles became the face of the campaign Our Music, #MYCALVINS. On July 16, 2018, Saoirse Ronan and Lupita Nyong'o were announced as the faces of Raf Simons first fragrance for the brand, named Women.

During summer 2020, the famous actor Ji Chang-wook was the first Korean mondial ambassador of the brand.

They also have experimented with emerging technologies. When advertising cKOne perfume in 1999, they placed e-mail addresses in print advertisements, targeted at teenagers.  When these teens mailed these addresses, they would be placed on a mailing list that sent them mails with vague details about the models' lives, with fake details meant to make them more relatable.  These mails came at unpredictable intervals and were supposed to give readers the feeling that they had some connection with these characters. Though the mailing lists were discontinued in 2002, the campaign has inspired similar marketing tactics for movies and other retail products. In 2019, Calvin Klein featured an ad by Sarah Rae Vargas for plus-sized women. In 2020, Calvin Klein invited black trans model Jari Jones and other eight LGBTQ models featured its pride campaign #PROUDINMYCALVINS.

Branding 
Like other fashion brands, Calvin Klein established a monogram: the "ck" emblem.

Licensees 
As of 2012, the top three licensees were:
 Warnaco Group – 40% of license royalties, which is "around $100 million"
 Coty – 12% of license royalties
 G-III Apparel Group – 14% of license royalties

Internet 
In 2004, the company bought the domain name CK.com. Calvin Klein is one of the few corporations worldwide to own a two letter domain name.

Designers 
When Calvin Klein was acquired by PVH Corp. in 2003, Francisco Costa was appointed the Women's Creative Director of Calvin Klein Collection. Costa had already worked with Klein directly before the founder's departure from the company, and had taken the director position in 2003.

Italo Zucchelli, a former Jil Sander and Romeo Gigli designer, had collaborated with Calvin Klein for six seasons before he became head designer and Men's Creative Director of the Calvin Klein Collection menswear line in spring 2004.

Kevin Carrigan, an Englishman, was named the global creative director of the ck Calvin Klein, Calvin Klein (white label), Calvin Klein Jeans and Calvin Klein Underwear brands and their related licensed products. Carrigan had been with Calvin Klein since 1998.

In April 2016, it was announced that Francisco Costa and Italo Zucchelli would be leaving the company.

In August 2016, Calvin Klein, Inc. announced the appointment of Raf Simons as Chief Creative Officer of the brand, overseeing all aspects of design, global market and communications, and visual creative services. Simons assumed the creative strategy of the Calvin Klein brand globally across the company's ready to wear, bridge, sportswear, jeans, underwear and home lines. Pieter Mulier was also announced as Creative Director, reporting directly to Simons and responsible for executing his creative and design vision for men's and women's ready to wear, bridge and better apparel and accessories. It was also announced that Kevin Carrigan resigned from the company for a creative role at Ralph Lauren. Simons's first collections debuted for the Fall 2017 season.

In December 2016, it was announced that Amy Mellen would leave the company.

In January 2017, it was announced that Clémande Burgevin Blachman would assume the role of Vice President of Design for Calvin Klein Home.

In December 2018, it was announced that Raf Simons had parted from Calvin Klein after only two years at the company.

In November 2020, Jessica Lomax was appointed Global Head of Design, leading Calvin Klein's global design strategy and providing creative direction across all areas of the business.

Corporate

Stores 
 Calvin Klein Collection
In the late 1990s, the company opened elegant Calvin Klein Collection stores in Paris, Seoul, and Taipei and ultra high-end cK Calvin Klein stores in Hong Kong, Milan, and Kuwait City. As of today, all stores are closed. Out of the two Calvin Klein Collection stores that existed in the US, the Dallas location in Highland Park Village which had been open for 20 years was closed in mid-2005. The only international location, in Paris, was closed by PVH in March 2006. The New York store, which serves as the company's flagship store at 654 Madison Ave., permanently closed in spring 2019. Partners maintain Calvin Klein Collection stores in Hong Kong, Shanghai, Mumbai, Seoul, Singapore, Kuala Lumpur, Bangkok, Dubai, and Qatar.

 Calvin Klein (white label)
Specialty retail Calvin Klein stores, designed by New York architecture firm Lynch/Eisinger/Design have been opened at Lenox Square in Atlanta, Beverly Center in Los Angeles; now closed down, Cherry Creek Mall in Denver; now closed down, Natick Collection in Natick, MA; closing down on July 25, 2010, The Mall at Partridge Creek in Michigan; now closed down, Aventura Mall in Aventura, Florida, South Coast Plaza in Costa Mesa California.  An additional eight stores also designed by Lynch/Eisinger/Design are set to open in 2008. There are also several Calvin Klein Outlet stores, mostly located within factory outlet malls in the US, that sell the white label sportswear and sometimes the Calvin Klein white label at reduced prices but do not carry the Collection lines.

 Calvin Klein Jeans
Calvin Klein Jeans stores exist around the globe. Among many other countries in the UK, Germany, Greece, Russia, Brazil, México, Croatia, Egypt, Chile, Argentina, India, the Philippines, Australia and New Zealand. They also offer franchisee and opened in Cali last year.

 Calvin Klein Underwear
Signature Calvin Klein Underwear boutiques can be found in Ljubljana, Buenos Aires, Cardiff (as of April 2011), Mexico City, Edinburgh, Glasgow, Melbourne, Hong Kong, London, Manchester, Manila, New York City, Shanghai, Singapore, Frankfurt am Main, Munich, Toronto, Hatfield, and  Burnaby, B.C. (Metro Vancouver).

 Department Stores
The major department stores in the US, including Macy's, Lord & Taylor, Dillard's, and Nordstrom, as well as many small independent stores carry the ck, white label and/or Jeans collections. Some high-end department stores, such as Bergdorf Goodman, Saks Fifth Avenue and Neiman Marcus also carry the Calvin Klein Collection. Notable retailers in the UK offering Calvin Klein include stores such as John Lewis, Debenhams and KJ Beckett. In Australia, the dominant retailer is Myer. Calvin Klein products are also found online with particular internet focus on selling Calvin Klein underwear and fragrance.

 Europe and Asia
In Europe, Calvin Klein is predominantly known for its underwear, accessories and perhaps the Collection business, rather than for the medium-priced sportswear lines which are available at select high-end retail stores. In Asia, there are also signature ck Calvin Klein stores that carry diffusion line, aka grey label including womenswear, menswear, accessories.

Controversies 
In 1980, Richard Avedon photographed and directed a Calvin Klein Jeans campaign that featured a fifteen-year-old Brooke Shields. Some of those advertisements were banned, including an infamous advert where Brooke asks, "Do you want to know what comes between me and my Calvins? Nothing!," often misquoted as "Nothing comes between me and my Calvins."

The 1995 adverts promoting Calvin Klein jeans received criticism for being "kiddie porn".

In August 2012, Lululemon Athletica filed suit against Calvin Klein and supplier G-III Apparel Group for infringement of three Lululemon design patents for yoga pants.  The lawsuit was somewhat unusual as it involved a designer seeking to assert intellectual property protection in clothing through patent rights. On November 20, 2012, Lululemon filed a notice of voluntary dismissal in the Delaware courts based upon a private settlement agreement reached between the parties that would dismiss the suit. According to a Lululemon press release,  "Lululemon values its products and related IP rights and takes the necessary steps to protect its assets when we see attempts to mirror our products.”

However, according to Chevalier's brand book Luxury Brand Management, Klein "is seldom involved in the design and the development of products bearing his name" and "all activities are subcontracted to licensees."

In 2014, Klein was criticized for the designation of Myla Dalbesio in its "Perfectly Fit" which offended many women as it is made for plus sizes.

In 2020, the Australian Strategic Policy Institute accused at least 82 major brands, including Calvin Klein, of being connected to forced Uyghur labor in Xinjiang.

See also 

 Sex in advertising
 Bonds (clothing)
 Gap Inc.
 H&M
 Zara (retailer)
 Desigual

References

External links 

 

Clothing brands of the United States
Clothing companies based in New York City
Shoe brands
1990s fashion
1980s fashion
1970s fashion
Underwear brands
American companies established in 1968
Clothing companies established in 1968
High fashion brands
Design companies established in 1968
1968 establishments in New York City
Watch manufacturing companies of the United States
PVH (company) clothing brands
Jeans by brand
Eyewear brands of the United States